USS LST-958 was an  in the United States Navy. Like many of her class, she was not named and is properly referred to by her hull designation.

Construction
LST-958 was laid down on 3 October 1944, at Hingham, Massachusetts, by the Bethlehem-Hingham Shipyard; launched on 31 October 1944; and commissioned on 25 November 1944.

Service history
During World War II, LST-958 was assigned to the Asiatic-Pacific theater and participated in the assault and occupation of Okinawa Gunto in May and June 1945.

Following the war, she performed occupation duty in the Far East until early October 1945. The ship was decommissioned on 14 March 1946, and struck from the Navy list on 28 March, that same year. On 20 December 1946, the tank landing ship was sold.

Awards
LST-958 earned one battle star for World War II service.

Notes

Citations

Bibliography 

Online resources

External links
 

LST-542-class tank landing ships
World War II amphibious warfare vessels of the United States
Ships built in Hingham, Massachusetts
1944 ships